The 2005–06 Cypriot Third Division was the 35th season of the Cypriot third-level football league. AEM Mesogis won their 1st title.

Format
Fourteen teams participated in the 2005–06 Cypriot Third Division. All teams played against each other twice, once at their home and once away. The team with the most points at the end of the season crowned champions. The first three teams were promoted to the 2006–07 Cypriot Second Division and the last three teams were relegated to the 2006–07 Cypriot Fourth Division.

Point system
Teams received three points for a win, one point for a draw and zero points for a loss.

Changes from previous season
Teams promoted to 2005–06 Cypriot Second Division
 SEK Agiou Athanasiou
 Elpida Xylofagou
 Iraklis Gerolakkou

Teams relegated from 2004–05 Cypriot Second Division
 ASIL Lysi
 Ermis Aradippou
 Akritas Chlorakas

Teams promoted from 2004–05 Cypriot Fourth Division
 Frenaros FC
 Digenis Oroklinis
 Atromitos Yeroskipou

Teams relegated to 2005–06 Cypriot Fourth Division
 Othellos Athienou
 Orfeas Nicosia
 AEK/Achilleas Ayiou Theraponta

League standings

Results

See also
 Cypriot Third Division
 2005–06 Cypriot First Division
 2005–06 Cypriot Cup

Sources

Cypriot Third Division seasons
Cyprus
2005–06 in Cypriot football